Kristen Joy Schaal (born January 24, 1978) is an American actress, comedian, and writer. She had voice roles as Louise Belcher on Bob's Burgers and  Mabel Pines on Gravity Falls. She also played Mel on Flight of the Conchords, Hurshe Heartshe on The Heart, She Holler, and Carol Pilbasian on The Last Man on Earth. She provided several voices for BoJack Horseman, for the character of Sarah Lynn, she was nominated for a Primetime Emmy Award for Outstanding Character Voice-Over Performance. Other roles include Amanda Simmons on The Hotwives of Orlando, Hazel Wassername on 30 Rock, Victoria Best on WordGirl, Trixie in the Toy Story franchise, and Anne on Wilfred. She was an occasional commentator on The Daily Show from 2008 to 2016. She voiced Sayrna in the 2019 EA video game Anthem.

Early life
Schaal was born in Longmont, Colorado, to a Lutheran family of Dutch ancestry. She was raised on her family's cattle ranch, in a rural area near Boulder, Colorado. Her father is a construction worker and her mother a secretary.

Schaal attended Skyline High School where she graduated in 1996. She has a brother, David, who is three years her elder. She attended the University of Colorado in Boulder for a year and graduated from Northwestern University. She then moved to New York in 2000 to pursue a comedy career. In 2005, she had her first break when she was included in the New York article "The Ten Funniest New Yorkers You've Never Heard Of".

Career

Live comedy
In 2006, Schaal performed at the 2006 HBO US Comedy Arts Festival in Aspen, where she won the award for "Best Alternative Comedian". She was also the winner of the second annual Andy Kaufman Award (hosted by the New York Comedy Festival), Best Female Stand-up at the 2006 Nightlife Awards in New York City, and "Best Female Stand Up Comedian" at the 2007 ECNY Awards. At the 2008 Melbourne International Comedy Festival, she won the Barry Award for her show Kristen Schaal As You Have Probably Never Seen Her Before, tying with Nina Conti. Also in 2006, Schaal appeared on the first season of the Comedy Central show Live at Gotham. She co-hosts the weekly variety show Hot Tub in Los Angeles, which was voted "Best Variety Show of 2005" by a Time-Out New York's readers poll. She also performs at the Peoples Improv Theater on the improv team, "Big Black Car". She is a founding member of the theatre company The Striking Viking Story Pirates, which adapts stories by children into sketches and songs.

Schaal performed live at the Edinburgh Fringe 2007 in Scotland, where she was one of six acts (chosen from over two hundred American productions at the Fringe) requested to perform at the US Consul General-sponsored "Fringe USA" Showcase.

On her return to the Edinburgh Fringe Festival in August 2008, Schaal was nominated for the If.comedy award for Kristen Schaal And Kurt Braunohler: Double Down Hearts.

Schaal has also performed at the Royal Albert Hall, London, as part of The Secret Policeman's Ball 2008 in aid of Amnesty International, and at the Bonnaroo 2009 music festival. In 2010, Schaal appeared as a stand-up comic on John Oliver's New York Stand Up Show and at the Solid Sound Festival at the Massachusetts Museum of Contemporary Art.

Film, TV, and radio

In 2001, Schaal had a bit role in the film Kate & Leopold. Schaal appeared on HBO's Flight of the Conchords as the stalker-fan Mel, a role which earned her an EWwy nomination for Best Supporting Actress in a Comedy Series in 2009. She was also a credited consultant and writer for Season 11 of South Park, and appeared on the BBC's Never Mind the Buzzcocks. 

She made her first appearance as a "special commentator" on Comedy Central's The Daily Show on March 13, 2008, often presented in recurring appearances as its news team's "Senior Women's Issues Correspondent". In 2008, she made an appearance on Good News Week during the Melbourne International Comedy Festival.  In October 2008 she appeared in Amnesty International's The Secret Policeman's Ball 2008. She also appeared on an episode of Last Week Tonight with John Oliver about sexual education, talking about abstinence and non-abstinence only education.

Other film and television credits include Aqua Teen Hunger Force, Snake 'n' Bacon, Norbit, Get Him to the Greek, Conviction, Cheap Seats, Freak Show, Cirque du Freak: The Vampire's Assistant, Adam and Steve, The Goods: Live Hard, Sell Hard, Delirious, Good News Week (Australia), Law & Order: Special Victims Unit, Law & Order: Criminal Intent, The Education of Max Bickford, Comedy Central's Contest Searchlight, Ugly Betty, How I Met Your Mother, MTV's Human Giant, and Mad Men. She was a contributor to the sketch/music series The Nighttime Clap on the Fuse music network. 

She appeared on Fuse's original comedy series The P.A.. She appeared in two TV pilots written and directed by Jersey City comedian Dan McNamara – The Calderons and Redeeming Rainbow, both of which were screened as official selections at the 2006 and 2007 New York Television Festivals. She appeared in television commercials for T-Mobile, Wendy's, RadioShack, Starburst, Sony Xperia, and Zaxby's. She made an appearance, in April 2008, on the IFC sketch comedy show The Whitest Kids U' Know. On April 3, 2009, she taped an episode of Comedy Central Presents. In 2010, she added her voice to the PBS Kids GO! series WordGirl as Victoria Best, a child prodigy whose parents taught her to be the best at everything that she does. Schaal voiced 12-year-old Mabel Pines on Disney Channel's hit TV series Gravity Falls. She currently voices the character Louise on the FOX Network series Bob's Burgers.

She starred in A. D. Miles' MyDamnChannel.com series Horrible People. In October 2008, Schaal appeared in an episode of Spicks and Specks. On June 10, 2009, Schaal broadcast her first radio show, High Five!!, on Sirius XM Radio's 'RawDog' channel with co-host Kurt Braunohler. Schaal stars in her own web series, Penelope Princess of Pets, one episode of which doubled as the video for the New Pornographers' "Mutiny, I Promise You". She voiced Trixie the Triceratops in Toy Story 3 and Pumpkin Witch and Palace Witch in Shrek Forever After. She was also in the music video for Joey Ramone's "New York City." She also guest-starred in the Modern Family episode "Fifteen Percent", as well as the music video for "Conversation 16" by The National. Schaal guest starred on the MC Frontalot album Solved. She was featured with Kurt Braunohler on the Radiolab episode "Loops". Schaal was in a commercial for the Xperia Play version of Minecraft.

Schaal guest starred on The Simpsons May 8, 2011 episode "Homer Scissorhands," in which she plays Taffy, a love interest of Milhouse. She is incorrectly listed in the credits as "Kristen Schall". This prompted Simpsons writers to issue her a unique apology on the next week's episode in which Bart's chalkboard joke in the intro to the show states "It's Kristen Schaal, not Kristen Schall." Schaal also appeared in a music video for "Weird Al" Yankovic's 2014 song "Tacky", a parody of Pharrell Williams' "Happy". In 2013, Schaal guest starred in the two-part episode "Sea Tunt" of Archer, lending her voice to a character named Tiffy. In 2014, Schaal co-starred alongside Casey Wilson, Danielle Schneider, Tymberlee Hill, Andrea Savage, and Angela Kinsey in the first season of the Hulu original series The Hotwives of Orlando. She co-starred alongside Will Forte in the FOX comedy The Last Man on Earth, which premiered on March 1, 2015.

Schaal also voices the character Sarah Lynn in the Netflix original animated series BoJack Horseman. In 2017, she was nominated for a Primetime Emmy Award for Outstanding Character Voice-Over Performance for her performance as Sarah Lynn. Schaal appeared in A Walk in the Woods (2015) as hiker Mary Ellen. In 2016, Schaal was a panelist on episode 1 of the British comedy show The Big Fat Quiz of Everything, a spinoff of The Big Fat Quiz of the Year. In 2017, Schaal was on Episode 49 of Good One: A Podcast About Jokes called  Schaal voices Molly in the Snap Originals series Death Hacks, co-starring with Thomas Middleditch. In 2020, she played the daughter of George Carlin's character in the sequel Bill & Ted Face the Music and guested on the first episode of Netflix's Aunty Donna's Big Ol' House of Fun. Schaal was featured in the episode "The Plantars Check In" in the animated series Amphibia in which she voiced Bella the Bellhop. Schaal appeared as a guest star in Scooby-Doo and Guess Who? on the episode "The Horrible Haunted Hospital of Dr. Phineas Phrag!". Schaal was featured on the episode "Dead Mall" in the animated series Bless the Harts where she voiced Stacey. Schaal currently stars as Number Two in the Disney+ series The Mysterious Benedict Society and regularly guest stars as the Guide on the FX series What We Do in the Shadows.

Books
Schaal wrote a book of humor, The Sexy Book of Sexy Sex, with her husband, former Daily Show writer Rich Blomquist. It was published in July 2010 by Chronicle Books. She originally intended for them to write the book under pseudonyms, "because I don't want anyone to imagine me doing those things", but realized it would be harder to promote the book without using their real names.

Personal life
Schaal has been married to Rich Blomquist since 2012. On February 11, 2018, she gave birth to a daughter named Ruby.

In 2017, during a charity stream hosted by Ethan Klein, Schaal revealed that she had suffered an ectopic pregnancy and a ruptured fallopian tube during an unspecified recording session for Gravity Falls, losing at least two litres of blood, and she underwent emergency surgery after being rushed to the hospital.

Filmography

Films

TV

Games

Audio

Music videos

Awards and nominations

References

External links

1978 births
21st-century American comedians
21st-century American actresses
21st-century American screenwriters
21st-century American women writers
Actresses from Colorado
Actresses from Los Angeles
American film actresses
American Lutherans
American people of Dutch descent
American stand-up comedians
American television actresses
American television writers
American voice actresses
American women comedians
Annie Award winners
Audiobook narrators
Comedians from Colorado
Living people
Northwestern University alumni
People from Longmont, Colorado
Screenwriters from Colorado
Shorty Award winners
University of Colorado Boulder alumni
American women television writers